DISA is a company founded in Denmark (with the name Compagnie Madsen A/S) which since 1900 has produced metal casting products.

In 1936 it changed name from Dansk Rekyl Riffel Syndikat A/S to Dansk Industri Syndikat A/S and was a defence manufacturer most notable for producing the Madsen machine gun and Madsen M-50.

History
In 1879 V.H.O Madsen designed an air-cooled, repeating machine gun which then took his name, Madsen. In the year 1900 the company Compagnie Madsen A/S was founded. This company was to produce this Madsen machine gun.

In 1930 A.P Møller bought a sum of shares corresponding to 15% of the total shares. In the following years A.P Møller expanded his shareholding to 31.6%, and was hereby the biggest shareholder.

Arms manufacturing products

 Madsen M1888 Self Loading rifle
 Madsen M1896 Flaadens Rekylgevær
 Madsen machine gun
 Schouboe Automatic Pistol
 Lightened Experimental submachine gun
 Madsen-Saetter machine gun
 Madsen M45
 Madsen-Ljungmann Self Loading rifle M. 1945
 Madsen M47
 51 mm Madsen Grenade launcher M 1947
 Madsen M50
 Madsen LAR
 Madsen 20 mm AA gun

References
Citations

Bibliography

External links
Official Website
Weapons Museum Website

Firearm manufacturers of Denmark
Danish companies established in 1900
Defense companies of Denmark
Manufacturing companies of Denmark